"Marsbook" is a 1993 interactive CD-ROM commissioned by NASA and developed by Human Code, to show politicians their projections for the colonization of Mars. Based on SuperCard, it models NASA's proposed Mars habitat. The CD uses prerendered 3D graphics to allow users to virtually walk through a computer model of the habitat. 

"Marsbook" won two New Media Invision Awards, as well as an award from Business Week. System requirements to run the simulation are a colour Macintosh II or greater, 8 megabytes of RAM, QuickTime, System 7.x, and a CD-ROM player.

See also
Red Faction (video game)  (2001 Video game set on Mars)

References

Further reading
 

Colonization of Mars
Exploration of Mars